Dora Puelma Francino de Fuenzalida (Antofagasta, March 22, 1898 - Santiago, April 1, 1972) was a Chilean painter, sculptor and writer who belonged to the Generación del 13. Her work was characterized by "fidelidad a la tradición pictórica del paisaje y las técnicas de la representación que siempre defendió por sobre las tendencias abstractas que se impusieron en su época" (fidelity to the pictorial tradition of landscape painting and the techniques of representation that she always defended over the abstract tendencies that prevailed in her time), which is why her work was included within Chilean pictorial naturalism that she approached mainly through the use of oil and watercolor techniques. 

After entering the School of Fine Arts, she was a student of Fernando Álvarez de Sotomayor y Zaragoza, Alberto Valenzuela Llanos, Juan Francisco González, and Pablo Burchard, while in the field of sculpture, she was a disciple of Virginio Arias.

Puelma also participated in other group exhibitions, among them the one held at the Ibero-American Exposition of 1929–30, where she received the bronze medal in painting.

Selected works

Artworks in public collections
Chilean National Museum of Fine Arts
 The perfect confidante, Drawing on paper,  
 Paisaje, Oil on canvas,  
 Mañana de primavera, Oil on canvas,

Books
 Pinceladas de Europa, 1954

References

1898 births
1972 deaths
People from Antofagasta
20th-century Chilean writers
20th-century Chilean painters
Chilean sculptors